Ismael Yaya (born 1965) is a long distance athlete who competed internationally for Chad

Niakaken represented Chad at the 1988 Summer Olympics in Seoul, he competed in the 10000 metres where he finished 19th in his heat and therefore did not qualify for the final.

References

1965 births
Living people
Olympic athletes of Chad
Athletes (track and field) at the 1988 Summer Olympics
Chadian male long-distance runners